Rusinów or Rusinow may refer to:
Rusinów, Lubusz Voivodeship (west Poland)
Rusinów, Gmina Rusinów in Masovian Voivodeship (east-central Poland)
Gmina Rusinów, Masovian Voivodeship
Rusinów, Silesian Voivodeship (south Poland)
 Rusinow leads, in the game of contract bridge